Yenice is a town in Çanakkale Province in the Marmara region of Turkey. It is the seat of Yenice District. Its population is 8,346 (2021).

History
On 18 March 1953 Yenice was subject to a M7.4 earthquake which left 998 dead and thousands of buildings damaged. A previous devastating earthquake had occurred here in 1440 AD.

Economy
People's basic occupation is agricultural work. Cereals, beans, tomatoes and tobacco are grown. There is a tomato paste processing plant in Yenice. Important towns in the district include: Kalkım, Hamdibey and Pazarköy.

Tourism is a relatively new component of Yenice's economy; however, wild boar hunting is becoming popular as a tourist attraction.

Notable people from Yenice
 İbrahim Bodur, entrepreneur
 Nuri Bilge Ceylan, film director

References

External links
 Road map of Yenice and environs
 Various images of Yenice, Çanakkale
 Photo of Yenice, Çanakkale, Pamoramio
 About Çanakkale

Populated places in Çanakkale Province
Yenice District, Çanakkale
Towns in Turkey